
Burnt Yates is a village in the Borough of Harrogate in North Yorkshire, England.

Community
The village name possibly derived from 'Burnt Gates', based on a belief that nearby gates were burnt.

Burnt Yates is part of the civil parish of Clint cum Hamlets in the rural subdivision of the Borough of Harrogate. Burnt Yates is in the UK Parliament Constituency of Skipton and Ripon, represented by the Conservative MP, David Curry.

The village school is Burnt Yates CE Primary School which Ofsted rated as 'Outstanding' in 2006–07, and 'Good' in 2011. Forty-two children attend the school. The school was required to become an academy following an 'Inadequate' rating in 2016, and in 2018, it was closed due to dwindling pupil numbers. However, in 2019, the school buildings were reopened as Admiral Long C.E. Primary School, as a local school (Bishop Thornton C of E School) needed to move to larger premises.

Countryside surrounding Burnt Yates is used for walking.

Transport
The main road through Burnt Yates is the B6165, which is the primary road route from Knaresborough to Glasshouses, North Yorkshire. A bus service between Pateley Bridge and Ripon passes through the village.

Distance to Major Cities of the UK

References

External links 

Burnt Yates Primary School Website
"welcome to ramblers Yorkshire!", Ramblersyorkshire.org

Villages in North Yorkshire
Nidderdale